Blonde is a hair color.

Blonde may also refer to:
 Blonde Ale, a type of beer

Film, TV and entertainment
 Blonde, a 2000 novel by Joyce Carol Oates, with a fictionalized take on the life of American actress Marilyn Monroe
 Blonde (2001 film), based on the novel
 Blonde (2022 film), based on the novel
 Blonde (1950 film), a 1950 French comedy film
 Chelani, one of the "sexes" in the all-female subculture of Aristasia
 The Blonde (Un rubio), 2019 film by Marco Berger
 The Blonde That Came to the House (Blondi tuli taloon), a Finnish drama television series

Ships
 Blonde-class cruiser, a two ship class of light scout cruisers
 Blonde (1803 ship), a French 32-gun privateer corvette
 HMS Blonde (1819), a modified Apollo class frigate, which undertook an important voyage to the Pacific in 1824
 HMS Blonde (1910), a Blonde class scout cruiser

Music
 Blonde (duo), a UK-based electronic music duo
 Blonde (Cœur de pirate album), a 2011 French-language album by Quebec singer-songwriter Cœur de pirate
 Blonde, an album by the band Ghost Beach
 Blonde (Alizée album), a 2014 French-language album by Alizée
 "Blonde" (Alizée song), 2014
 "Blonde", a song by Barnaby Bye
 Blonde (Akina Nakamori song), 1987
 Blondes (John Stewart album), 1982
 Blondes (band), a New York City-based electronic music duo
 Blondes (Blondes album), their 2012 self-titled debut
 Blonde (Frank Ocean album), a 2016 album by Frank Ocean
 "Blonde", a song by Bridgit Mendler
 "Blonde", a song by Waterparks

See also

 Blond (disambiguation)
 HMS Blonde – list of ships with this name
 Mr. Blonde
 Stella Goldschlag (1922–1994), nicknamed the "Blonde Poison" by the Nazis.
 Blondie (disambiguation)
 Platinum Blonde (disambiguation)